Víctor Fernández Satué (born 2 May 1998) is a Spanish professional footballer who plays as a winger for Enosis Neon Paralimni.

Career
Born in Sant Cugat del Vallès, Barcelona, Catalonia, Fernández started his career at FC Sant Cugat Esport before joining UE Cornellà's youth setup. On 3 January 2016, aged just 16, he made his first team debut by coming on as a late substitute in a 2–1 Segunda División B away win against CF Reus Deportiu.

On 3 February 2017, Fernández moved abroad and joined Newcastle United, being assigned to the under-23 squad. In 2018, he suffered a heel injury, subsequently picking up a hip problem which kept him out for the entire 2018–19 campaign; he returned to action in July 2019.

On 31 July 2020, after being released by Newcastle, Fernández moved to Romanian Liga I side FC Viitorul Constanța after signing a three-year contract. He made his professional debut on 22 August, replacing Ștefan Bodișteanu in a 1–1 home draw against FC UTA Arad.  He then joined FC Botosani for an undisclosed fee. He left them in the same month to join back his former club UE Cornellà on a free transfer on the 30th of January 2021. He made his second spell debut at the club in a 4–3 win to RCD Espanyol B. He scored the 3rd goal in the game after coming on as a substitute. On his second game for the Spanish club he scored another goal.

References

External links
 
 
 

1998 births
Living people
People from Sant Cugat del Vallès
Sportspeople from the Province of Barcelona
Spanish footballers
Footballers from Catalonia
Association football wingers
Segunda División B players
UE Cornellà players
English Football League players
Premier League players
Newcastle United F.C. players
Liga I players
FC Viitorul Constanța players
FC Botoșani players
Super League Greece players
Volos N.F.C. players
Spanish expatriate footballers
Spanish expatriate sportspeople in England
Spanish expatriate sportspeople in Romania
Spanish expatriate sportspeople in Greece
Expatriate footballers in England
Expatriate footballers in Romania
Expatriate footballers in Greece